The Book of Queer is a Discovery+ five-part series created by Eric Cervini about LGBT historical figures, which premieres in June 2022.

Guest narrators for the series include comedian Margaret Cho; actress Dominique Jackson; actors Alex Newell and Leslie Jordan; and television personality Ross Mathews.

References 

2022 in LGBT history
2022 American television series debuts
2020s American LGBT-related television series